The Mahavidya (lit. Great Wisdoms) are a group of ten Hindu Tantric goddesses. The 10 Mahavidyas are usually named in the following sequence: Kali, Tara, Tripura Sundari, Bhuvaneshvari, Bhairavi , Chhinnamasta, Dhumavati, Bagalamukhi, Matangi and Kamala.  Nevertheless, the formation of this group encompass divergent and varied religious traditions that include yogini worship, Saivism, Vaishnavism, and Vajrayana Buddhism.

The development of the Mahavidyas represent an important turning point in the history of Shaktism as it marks the rise of the Bhakti aspect in Shaktism, which reached its zenith in 1700 CE. First sprung forth in the post-Puranic age, around 6th century C.E., it was a new theistic movement in which the supreme being was envisioned as female. A fact epitomized by texts like Devi-Bhagavata Purana, especially its last nine chapters (31-40) of the seventh skandha, which are known as the Devi Gita, and soon became central texts of Shaktism.

Names
Shaktas believe, "the one Truth is sensed in ten different facets; the Divine Mother is adored and approached as ten cosmic personalities," the Dasa-Mahavidya ("ten-Mahavidyas"). As per another school of thought in Shaktism Mahavidyas are considered to be form of Mahakali. The Mahavidyas are considered Tantric in nature, and are usually identified as:

Kali The ultimate form of Brahman, "Devourer of Time" (Supreme Deity of Kalikula systems). Mahakali is of a pitch black complexion, darker than the dark of the Death-Night. She has three eyes, representing the past, present and future. She has shining white, fang-like teeth, a gaping mouth, and her red, bloody tongue hanging from there. She has unbound, disheveled hairs. She was wearing tiger skins as her garments, a garland of skulls and a garland of rosy red flowers around her neck, and on her belt, she was adorned with skeletal bones, skeletal hands as well as severed arms and hands as her ornamentation. She has four hands, two of them had the trident the trishul and the sword and two others carried a demon head and a bowl collecting the blood dripping from demon head.
Tara The Goddess as Guide and Protector, or Who Saves. Who offers the ultimate knowledge which gives salvation. She is the goddess of all sources of energy. The energy of the sun is also a grant from her. She manifested as the mother of Lord Shiva after the incident of Samudra manthan to heal him as her child. Tara is of a light blue complexion. She has disheveled hair, wearing a crown decorated with the digit of the half-moon. She has three eyes, a snake coiled comfortably around her throat, wearing the skins of tigers, and a garland of skulls. She is also seen wearing a belt supporting her skirt made of tiger-skin. Her four hands carry a lotus, scimitar, demon head and scissors. Her left foot rests on the laying down Shiva.
Tripura Sundari (Shodashi, Lalita) The Goddess Who is "Beautiful in the Three Worlds" (Supreme Deity of Srikula systems); the "Tantric Parvati" or the "Moksha Mukta". She is the head of Manidweepa, the eternal supreme abode of the goddess. Shodashi is seen with a molten gold complexion, three placid eyes, a calm mien, wearing red and pink vestments, adorned with ornaments on her divine limbs and four hands, each holding a goad, lotus, a bow and arrow. She is seated on a throne.
Bhuvaneshvari The Goddess as World Mother, or Whose Body is all 14 lokas (whole cosmos). Bhuvaneshwari is of a fair, golden complexion, with three content eyes as well as a calm mien. She wears red and yellow garments, decorated with ornaments on her limbs and has four hands. Two of her four hands hold a goad and noose while her other two hands are open. She is seated on a divine, celestial throne.
Bhairavi The Fierce Goddess. The female version of Bhairav. Bhairavi is of a fiery, volcanic red complexion, with three furious eyes, and disheveled hair. Her hair is matted, tied up in a bun, decorated by a crescent moon as well as adorning two horns, one sticking out from each side. She has two protruding tusks from the ends of her bloody mouth. She wears red and blue garments and is adorned with a garland of skulls around her neck. She also wears a belt decorated with severed hands and bones attached to it. She is also decked with snakes and serpents too as her ornamentation – rarely is she seen wearing any jewelry on her limbs. Of her four hands, two are open and two hold a rosary and book.
Chhinnamasta The self-decapitated Goddess. She chopped her own head off in order to satisfy Jaya and Vijaya (metaphors of Rajas and Tamas - part of the trigunas). Chinnamasta has a red complexion, embodied with a frightful appearance. She has disheveled hair. She has four hands, two of which hold a sword and another hand holding her own severed head; three blazing eyes with a frightful mien, wearing a crown. Two of her other hands hold a lasso and drinking bowl. She is a partially clothed lady, adorned with ornaments on her limbs and wearing a garland of skulls on her body. She is mounted upon the back of a copulating couple.
Dhumavati (The widow goddess) Dhumavati is of a smoky dark brown complexion, her skin is wrinkled, her mouth is dry, some of her teeth have fallen out, her long disheveled hair is gray, her eyes are seen as bloodshot and she has a frightening mien, which is seen as a combined source of anger, misery, fear, exhaustion, restlessness, constant hunger and thirst. She wears white clothes, donned in the attire of a widow. She is sitting in a horseless chariot as her vehicle of transportation and on top of the chariot, there is an emblem of a crow as well as a banner. She has two trembling hands, her one hand bestows boons and/or knowledge and the other holds a winnowing basket.
Bagalamukhi The Goddess Who Paralyzes Enemies. Goddess Bagalamukhi has a molten gold complexion with three bright eyes, lush black hair and a benign mien. She is seen wearing yellow garments and apparel. She is decked with yellow ornaments on her limbs. Her two hands hold a mace or club and holds demon Madanasur by the tongue to keep him at bay. She is shown seated on either a throne or on the back of a crane.
Matangi The Prime Minister of Lalita (in Srikula systems), sometimes called the "Tantric Saraswati". Matangi is depicted as emerald green in complexion, with lush, disheveled black hair, three placid eyes and a calm look on her face. She is seen wearing red garments and apparel, bedecked with various ornaments all over her delicate limbs. She is seated on a royal throne and she has four hands, three of which hold a sword or scimitar, a skull and a Veena (a musical instrument). Her one hand bestows boons to her devotees.
Kamalatmika(Kamala) The Lotus Goddess; sometimes called the "Tantric Lakshmi". Kamala is of a molten gold complexion with lush black hair, three bright, placid eyes, and a benevolent expression. She is seen wearing red and pink garments and apparel and bedecked with various ornaments and lotuses all over her limbs. She is seated on a fully bloomed lotus, while with her four hands, two hold lotuses while two grant her devotees' wishes and assures protection from fear.

All these Mahavidyas reside in Manidweepa.

The Maha bhagavata Purana and Brihaddharma Purana however, list Shodashi (Sodasi) as Tripura Sundari, which is simply another name for the same goddess. The Guhyati guyha-tantra associates the Mahavidyas with the ten Avatars of Vishnu, and states that the Mahavidyas are the source from which the avatars of Vishnu arose.

Note: In the above list do not get confused the names of Matanga Bhairava with Matanga Rishi, and Narada Bhairava with Narada Rishi.

In popular culture 

 The Tenth Riddle, a novel by Sapan Saxena, is based on the core theme of Mahavidyas and their legends

See also
Navadurga

References

Bibliography

External links
 

Hindu goddesses
Forms of Parvati
 
Hindu tantric deities